Quarry Park is a mixed-use community in Calgary, Alberta, Canada. For 50 years it was a gravel extraction site in the southeast quadrant of the city, surrounded by residential communities but used solely for industrial gravel production. In 2005, the land was purchased by a local development corporation and evolved into the community that it is today. With over 400 acres of community land, Quarry Park is now home to a market, a variety of residential developments, riverside green space and corporate office buildings including Imperial Oil and Remington Development Corporation.

Throughout Calgary, nearly 800 kilometers of pathways connect citizens to the natural landscape of the city. Over 10 kilometres of paved paths run throughout the community of Quarry Park allowing residents to cycle, run, walk, rollerblade and simply enjoy the abundant green space found throughout the community. Punctuating the development's focus on natural spaces is a 50-acre environmental reserve connected to the community and Calgary's renowned pathway system.

Due to its location in southeast Calgary, Quarry Park contributes to the increasing number of reverse commuters traveling from the downtown core to suburban locales for daily work. While the majority of traffic flows into downtown on any given morning, the abundance of major corporations in Quarry Park bring commuters to a different area of the city, decreasing congestion along the standard traffic routes. Reverse commuters often face fewer traffic problems than standard commuters, and encounter less congestion on public transportation.

Built on the banks of the Bow River, Quarry Park has been designed based on many flood mitigation strategies to ensure the community does not face devastation at the hands of flooding. The Bow River flooded in the spring of 2013, causing major damage to many areas in Calgary and its surrounding communities. Quarry Park, despite being located in an evacuation zone, remained completely dry.

The engineers of Quarry Park studied polders extensively, which are low-lying areas near water and often found in the Netherlands and other seaside countries. Based on the engineering of polders, Quarry Park was built with an insulated, reinforced riprap berm designed to withstand a one-in-100 year flood event. Other precautions were also taken including a stormwater lift station to discharge rainwater into the Bow River, and overland canals to divert and filter water.

Since inception, Quarry Park has been making an environmental impact and statement with many important accomplishments. An example of this is the use of recycled materials in Quarry Park construction such as demolished and crushed asphalt, or concrete and aggregate from roads, parking lots and buildings. Quarry Park West, an office building home to TD Canada Trust Commercial Banking, is a LEED Gold Certified building and boasts a green roof. All Quarry Park buildings currently under construction are being constructed to LEED standards. Quarry Park employs an innovative process for stormwater management including a linear pond and creek system that transports and cleans water before it flows back into the Bow River.

References

Mixed-use developments in Canada